Core 1 synthase, glycoprotein-N-acetylgalactosamine 3-beta-galactosyltransferase, 1, also known as C1GALT1, is an enzyme which in humans is encoded by the C1GALT1 gene.

Function
The common core 1 O-glycan structure Gal-beta-1-3GalNAc-R is a precursor for many extended mucin-type O-glycan structures in animal cell surface and secreted glycoproteins. Core 1 is synthesized by the transfer of Gal from UDP-Gal to GalNAc-alpha-1-R by core 1 beta-3-galactosyltransferase (C1GALT1).

C1GALT1 is associated with the T-Tn antigen system.

Clinical significance
There is some evidence that mutations in the C1GALT1 gene may be associated with kidney disease.

See also
 Glycoprotein-N-acetylgalactosamine 3-beta-galactosyltransferase

References

Blood antigen systems
Transfusion medicine